Events from the year 1773 in Canada.

Incumbents
Monarch: George III

Governors
Governor of the Province of Quebec: Guy Carleton
Governor of Nova Scotia: Lord William Campbell
Commodore-Governor of Newfoundland: John Byron
Governor of St. John's Island: Walter Patterson

Events
 December – Prominent French Canadians petition the King to restore their ancient laws and accord them the rights of British subjects, reminding him that five-sixths of the seigniories belong to Frenchmen. They represent that the Labrador Coast and fisheries, now alienated to Newfoundland, should revert to Canada. They prefer a Legislative Council, nominated by the King, because less expensive than an Elective Assembly.
 Lord Dartmouth promises Canadians just and considerate treatment respecting their religion.
 Montreal Ft. La Traite, on Churchill River, by Frobisher to cut into HBC's trade.

Births
 January 14 – William Amherst, 1st Earl Amherst, diplomat and governor general (d.1857)

Full date unknown
 Joseph Willcocks, diarist, office holder, printer, publisher, journalist, politician, and army officer (d.1814)

Deaths
 January 31 – Sebastian Zouberbuhler, merchant and politician in Nova Scotia

Historical documents

Canada
Attorney General says minimize change to laws of Canada, which should conform to its form of government, religion and revenue (Note: "savage" used)

Two Exchequer-linked MPs say ministry has been asleep for 7 years while Canada needed proper government; Lord North says reforms will come in time

Earl of Dartmouth on Quebec policies (religion, western territory) to be addressed shortly, plus cases involving Indigenous people (Note: "savages" used)

Ninety freeholders sign petition to lieutenant-governor for popular assembly in Quebec, citing its good effect on "peace, welfare, and good government"

Indigenous man from St.-Francois in Boston to seek "satisfaction for the deaths of several Indians[...]killed at different times in the woods by the English"

21st Regiment leaving Quebec after 1 year, during which only 4 soldiers died - matchless record, even against "young and healthy Corps" from Britain

"Marie Louise Blanchard was inhumanly beat and abus'd by some Soldiers in such a Manner that she expir'd" next morning

Gazette co-owner's widow asks debtors pay money owed partnership so she can clear his debts and assume partnership management now denied her

Pierre Ignace Dubois, baker, and his wife, Therese Charlotte Campion, buy stone house on Notre-Dame St., Montreal, for 6,500 shillings

Surveyor-general, 4 Abenaki and 2 Hurons complete 3-month trek from Quebec to Boston to find best route for road between Canada and Massachusetts

Nova Scotia
Temporary stop to shipping Nova Scotia grain, flour, meal or pease from Bay of Fundy ports before threshing season, and "to prevent a Scarcity thereof"

Ed. Donahoo, having pled guilty to "assault with an intent to ravish" 8-year-old, is sentenced to 1 hour in pillory, £10 fine and 1 month in prison

500 acre lot of cleared land for lease is on former site of Indigenous settlement at edge of 9-mile-long Eel Lake, between Barrington and Yarmouth

Late Haligonian's estate at auction includes wharf, farm and other lots, fish barrels, seine, salmon nets, and "also a Negro named Prince" in private sale

Missionary's Gospel guide is for poor people of Lunenburg to understand "Christian doctrine and Christian duty, as far as it is necessary in your Station"

Books for sale in Halifax: "Macaulay's history of England," "Spectators, Tatlers, and Guardian," "Pope's Works, 4 vol." and "Smollet's Don Quixotte, 4 vol"

With death of long-time Halifax schoolmaster, another plans to teach "Reading and Writing English, Bookkeeping, practical Geometry, Mensuration" etc.

"Anna Fisher [will open a school in Halifax to] Teach Children the Rudiments of Reading and Writing, Sewing, and all sorts of Needle-Work"

"John Rea, Master of Musick in the 59th Regt. takes this opportunity of informing the Public, that he teaches the German Flute"

"The nights are now of a great length, therefore take care that you do not sleep too much, that being as hurtful to the body as too little."

Prince Edward Island
St. John's Island "settlers turn themselves to the farming business," and their rich soil "produces excellent crops of the finest wheat in America"

Because Island lacks enough qualified jurors in each county, criminal and civil cases will be tried in Queen's County with any Island jurors

Newfoundland
Royal Navy cruisers are to seize "all mercantile goods, spirituous liquors, &c." that cannot be considered Newfoundland fishers' ship stores

Labrador
George Cartwright's Inuit guests in England enjoy visit, but all but one die on return to Labrador and their people's "violent, frantic expressions of grief"

Cartwright on his "slave girl's" father, to whom he traded bait-skiff for her and who died, leaving Cartwright "a legacy of two wives and three children"

Elsewhere
"Sleeping at the edge of the sea" - Hudson's Bay Company loses trade of inland Indigenous people to "numerous and indefatigable" Canadian traders

Alexander Henry the elder sets miners to work on vein of copper on Lake Superior north shore, but difficulty of work and diminishing vein end operation

"We have certain advices from Boston" that people "dressed like Indians" went on East India Company ship and threw overboard about 340 chests of tea

John Harrison, inventor of marine chronometer for determining longitude, receives £9,585 as final installment of £20,000 prize "for his useful discovery"

References 

 
Canada
73